Arun Chandra Guha was an Indian politician. He was elected to the Lok Sabha, the lower house of the Parliament of India from the Barasat constituency of West Bengal in 1952, 1957 and 1962 as a member of the Indian National Congress .

References

External links
 Official biographical sketch in Parliament of India website

1892 births
Year of death missing
Indian National Congress politicians
Lok Sabha members from West Bengal
India MPs 1952–1957
India MPs 1957–1962
India MPs 1962–1967
Members of the Constituent Assembly of India
People from North 24 Parganas district